Marainville-sur-Madon (literally Marainville on Madon) is a commune in the Vosges department in Grand Est in northeastern France.

Geography
Marainville is positioned in the north-east of the department.  It is the last commune traversed by the Madon before that river continues north into the adjacent département of Meurthe-et-Moselle.

The land is devoted to agriculture: there is no longer any forest in the commune.

Interesting discovery
A seventh-century tomb was identified under a tumulus in 1977 and excavated between 1986 and 1988.   It appears to be connected with the pre-Christian fortifications at Saxon-Sion in Meurthe-et-Moselle.

Personalities
Michał Jan Pac (1730-1787), a Polish nobleman exiled after the defeat of the Bar Confederation, bought the castle and Marainville in 1780; his steward, Adam Weydlich, made acquaintance with the village syndic, François Chopin.
 
François Chopin had a son, Nicolas. After Pac's death, the Weydlichs left France for Poland, and Nicolas Chopin emigrated with them; in 1810, his better known son, Frédéric Chopin, was born in the Polish village of Żelazowa Wola.

See also
Communes of the Vosges department

References

Communes of Vosges (department)